Grand Angoulême is the communauté d'agglomération, an intercommunal structure, centred on the city of Angoulême. It is located in the Charente department, in the Nouvelle-Aquitaine region, southwestern France. It was created in January 2017. Its seat is in Angoulême. Its population was 141,367 in 2017, of which 41,740 in Angoulême proper.

Composition
The communauté d'agglomération consists of the following 38 communes:

Angoulême
Asnières-sur-Nouère
Balzac
Bouëx
Brie
Champniers
Claix
La Couronne
Dignac
Dirac
Fléac
Garat
Gond-Pontouvre
L'Isle-d'Espagnac
Jauldes
Linars
Magnac-sur-Touvre
Marsac
Mornac
Mouthiers-sur-Boëme
Nersac
Plassac-Rouffiac
Puymoyen
Roullet-Saint-Estèphe
Ruelle-sur-Touvre
Saint-Michel
Saint-Saturnin
Saint-Yrieix-sur-Charente
Sers
Sireuil
Soyaux
Torsac
Touvre
Trois-Palis
Vindelle
Vœuil-et-Giget
Voulgézac
Vouzan

References

Angouleme
Angouleme